Prosopocera gigantea is a species of beetle in the family Cerambycidae. It was described by Stephan von Breuning in 1950. It is known from Tanzania and Malawi.

References

Prosopocerini
Beetles described in 1950